A Quarterland or Ceathramh (Scottish Gaelic) was a Scottish land measurement. It was used mainly in the west and north.

It was supposed to be equivalent to eight fourpennylands, roughly equivalent to a quarter of a markland. However, in Islay, a quarterland was equivalent to a quarter of an ounceland. Half of a quarterland would be an ochdamh(ie.one-eighth), and in Islay a quarter of a quarterland a leothras(ie.one-sixteenth).

The name appears in many Scottish placenames, notably Kirriemuir. 
 Kerrowaird – Ceathramh àrd (High Quarterland)
 Kerrowgair – Ceathramh geàrr (Rough Quarterland)
 Kerry (Cowal) - An Ceathramh Còmh’lach (The Cowal Quarterland)
 Kerrycroy - An Ceathramh cruaidh (The Hard Quarterland)
 Kirriemuir – An Ceathramh Mòr/Ceathramh Mhoire (either "The Big Quarterland" or "Mary’s Quarterland")

Ceathramh was also used in Gàidhlig for a bushel and a firlot (or four pecks), as was Feòirling, the term used for a farthlingland.

Isle of Man
The Isle of Man retained a similar system into historic times: in the traditional land divisions of treens (c.f. the Scottish Gaelic word trian, a third part) which are in turn subdivided into smaller units called quarterlands.

See also
 Obsolete Scottish units of measurement
 In the East Highlands:
 Rood
 Scottish acre = 4 roods
 Oxgang (Damh-imir) = the area an ox could plow in a year (around 20 acres)
 Ploughgate (?) = 8 oxgangs
 Daugh (Dabhach) = 4 ploughgates
 In the West Highlands:
 Markland (Marg-fhearann) = 8 Ouncelands (varied)
 Ounceland (Tir-unga) =20 Pennylands
 Pennyland (Peighinn) = basic unit; sub-divided into half penny-land and farthing-land
 (Other terms in use; Quarterland (Ceathramh): variable value; Groatland (Còta bàn)
 Townland
 Township (Scotland)

References

 

Obsolete Scottish units of measurement
History of the Isle of Man
Units of area